The 2019–20 Polish Basketball League (PLK) season, the Energa Basket Liga for sponsorship reasons, was the 86th season of the Polish Basketball League, the highest professional basketball league in Poland. Anwil Włocławek were the defending champions.

On 17 March 2020, the league was ended prematurely due to the coronavirus pandemic. Stelmet Enea Zielona Góra were named champions.

Teams 
16 teams will participate this season.  Enea Astoria Bydgoszcz and Śląsk Wrocław were promoted from the I Liga, while Miasto Szkla Krosno was relegated. Koszalin did not get a licence this season.

Locations and venues

Regular season

League table

Results

Polish clubs in European competitions

Polish clubs in Regional competitions

References

External links
Polska Liga Koszykówki - Official Site 
Polish League at Eurobasket.com

Polish Basketball League seasons
Poland
PLK
PLK